Andrea Turini or Thurini (circa 1473 – 1543) was an Italian physician and writer.

Born in Pescia in Tuscany, he became Professor of Medicine at the University of Pisa. He became a prominent physician, serving both Popes Clement VII and Paul III. He also was a physician for the French kings Louis XII and Francis I. He published a book on his medical practice (Opera Andreae Thurini) in 1545. A Portrait of a man and a dog, was attributed by Tom Virzi in 1910 to Raphael and depicting Turini. Andrea's brother Baldassare had been a datary in the Papal court, and was a friend of Raphael.

References

16th-century Italian physicians
16th-century writers
People from Tuscany
1473 births
1543 deaths